Short Circuits (Slovene: Kratki stiki) is a 2006 Slovene film directed by Janez Lapajne. It was Slovenia's submission to the 80th Academy Awards for the Academy Award for Best Foreign Language Film, but was not accepted as a nominee.

See also
List of submissions to the 80th Academy Awards for Best Foreign Language Film

References

External links

2006 films
2006 drama films
Slovene-language films
Slovenian drama films